Marko Hranilović (11 December 1908, Zagreb – 25 September 1931, Zagreb) was a Croatian nationalist and Secretary of the separatist Croatian Rights Youth (HPO) in the Kingdom of Yugoslavia. He was executed in 1931 after being convicted of the murder of a journalist.

Hranilović was implicated in the trial after the arrest of Stjepan Javor, head of the HPO, on 31 October 1929. The HPO was accused of being a terrorist organization and Hranilović was charged with the murder of journalist Toni Schlegel. During the course of the trial, the HPO was accused of associating with the nationalist exiles Ante Pavelić and Gustav Perčec. Hranilović vehemently denied any contact with these figures, and proved to be one of the most combative in court. He pleaded not guilty to all charges. He sparred with the court several times, including one instance where he called himself a "citizen of imprisoned Croatia".

Vladko Maček and Mile Budak served as attorneys for the defence. Maček, as leader of the Croatian Peasant Party, was essentially the leader of the Croats within the kingdom at this time. Despite the defence's best efforts, Hranilović was sentenced to death. He was hanged, along with Matija Soldin, on 25 September 1931 on Petrinja Street, Zagreb.

Links
 Mario Jareb, Ustaško-domobranski pokret. Školska knjiga, d.d., Zagreb, 2006.

1908 births 
1931 deaths
People executed by Yugoslavia by hanging
Executed Croatian people
Executed politicians
Croatian Peasant Party politicians